The 2017–18 Santosh Trophy was the 72nd edition of the Santosh Trophy, the premier competition in India for teams representing their regional and state football associations. The competition began with qualifiers on 8 January 2018 and concluded with the final on 1 April 2018. Kerala won the competition, their sixth championship, by defeating West Bengal during the final in penalties 4–2.

West Bengal were the defending champions, having defeated Goa in the final during the 2016–17 season. The entire tournament took place in Kolkata.

Qualifiers

The following ten teams had qualified for the 2017–18 Santosh Trophy:

 Chandigarh
 Goa
 Karnataka
 Kerala
 Maharashtra
 Manipur
 Mizoram
 Odisha
 Punjab
 West Bengal

Group stage

Group A

Group B

Knockout stage

Semi-finals

Final

Goalscorers
5 goals

 Jithin MS (Kerala)
 Victorino Fernandes (Goa)

4 goals

 S. Rajesh (Karnataka)
 Lalromawia (Mizoram)
 Bidyashagar Singh (West Bengal)

3 goals

 Rahul KP (Kerala)
 Afdal V.K. (Kerala)
 Ranjeet Singh (Maharashtra)
 Jiten Murmu (West Bengal)

2 goals

 Vishal Sharma (Chandigarh)
 Mackroy Peixote (Goa)
 Shubert Jonas Perriera (Goa)
 Leon Augustine (Karnataka)
 Jithin Gopalan (Kerala)
 F Lalrinpuia (Mizoram)
 Lalremruata (Mizoram)
 Jitender Rawat (Punjab)
 Sumit Das (West Bengal)
 Tirthankar Sarkar (West Bengal)

1 goal

 Vivek Rana (Chandigarh)
 Kapil Hoble (Goa)
 Marcus Masceranhas (Goa)
 Nestor Dias (Goa)
 Gunashekar Vignesh (Karnataka)
 Sajith Poulose (Kerala)
 Sreekuttan V.S. (Kerala)
 Rahul Raj (Kerala)
 Vibin Thomas (Kerala)
 Leander Dharmai (Maharashtra)
 Shubham Khanvilkar (Maharashtra)
 Dion Menezes (Maharashtra)
 Sahil Bhokare (Maharashtra)
 Nikhil Prabhu (Maharashtra)
 Kiran Pandhare (Maharashtra)
 Naqiur Ansari (Maharashtra)
 Ngangbam Naocha (Manipur)
 Chanso Horam (Manipur)
 Dhananjoy Singh (Manipur)
 Zomuanpuia C (Mizoram)
 Malsawmdawngliana (Mizoram)
 Arpan Lakra (Odisha)
 Arjun Nayak (Odisha)
 Sunil Sardar (Odisha)
 Sarbjit Singh (Punjab)
 Baltej Singh (Punjab)
 Gurtej Singh (Punjab)
 Manotosh Chakladar (West Bengal)
 Rajon Barman (West Bengal)

Own goals

 Matthew Gonsalves (Goa)
 Roshan Singh (Manipur)
 Rudra Pradhan (Odisha)

References

External links
 Santosh Trophy on the All India Football Federation website .

 
Santosh Trophy seasons